is a Japanese original net animation (ONA) anime series created by Mamoru Oshii. It was animated by Drive and produced by Ichigo Animation. The series was directed by Mamoru Oshii and Junji Nishimura. It was originally scheduled to premiere in October 2020, but it was delayed due to the effects of the COVID-19 pandemic. The first half of the series was released online in February 2021, while the second half was released online in March 2021. The series is a slapstick comedy centred on a vampire girl and a high school girl.

Characters

Production and release
The series was created by Mamoru Oshii, who is also credited as chief director, and was directed by Junji Nishimura. The screenplay was written by Oshii and Kei Yamamura featuring character designs by Issei Arakaki, and Kenji Kawai composing the series' music. Oshii announced that the series would focus on five young girls and had no prominent male characters. The series was first announced in May 2019, with further details being revealed in June 2019. The concept and characters originated in the 2013 mobile game Chimamire Mai Love.

The series was funded by a single investor, Ichigo Animation, a subsidiary of Ichigo Inc., a new financing arrangement in Japanese anime that replaces the "sclerotic production committee system" and gives directors like Oshii and Nishimura more freedom, according to The Japan Times.

The opening theme for the "Mai Version" of the series is "Winds of Transylvania" by Lovebites, chosen by Oshii and Nishimura because they felt the band's members and concept were similar to the series' main character and unconventional themes. Lovebites' members appear in the anime's opening credits, which also features Vlad Loves fictional characters performing the song in a sequence that the animators based on the band's. "Where You Are" performed by Kanako Takatsuki and Karin Isobe as part of the vocal and dance unit BlooDye is used for the "Mitsugu Version" of the opening sequence. alan & Ayasa performed the ending theme  for the Japanese version of the series, while Ayasa alone performed the instrumental  for the ending of the international versions. A CD including all four theme songs was released at Ichigo Animation's CulZone stores on January 9, 2021.

It was scheduled to premiere in April 2020, but it was delayed to October 2020. On May 8, 2020, it was announced that series was delayed again due to the COVID-19 pandemic. The first episode of the series had an advanced streaming debut on December 18, 2020. On December 28, 2020, it was announced the first half of the series would be released online on AbemaTV, Amazon Prime Video Japan, and various other streaming outlets on February 14, 2021 (Valentine's Day). It was hoped by series producers that the anime would first broadcast on television, but that plan never came into fruition. The second half was released on March 14, 2021 (White Day). Crunchyroll licensed the series.

Episode list

See also
 Mamoru Oshii
 Junji Nishimura
 Ichigo Inc.

Notes

References

External links
 

2021 anime ONAs
Anime postponed due to the COVID-19 pandemic
Anime with original screenplays
Comedy anime and manga
Crunchyroll anime
Vampires in anime and manga